New World Center is a 53-floor 238 meter (781 foot) tall skyscraper completed in 2006 located in Shenzhen, China.

External links
Emporis.com – New World Center
SkyscraperPage.com - Shenzhen New World Center Tower

Buildings and structures completed in 2006
Skyscraper office buildings in Shenzhen